Björn Dahlbäck (born 1949) is a Swedish physician, medical researcher, and professor of clinical chemistry, specializing in hematology and the molecular mechanisms of blood coagulation. He determined that activated protein C (APC) resistance is the most common inherited risk factor of venous thrombosis.

Education and career
Dahlbäck graduated with an M.D. from Lund University and then completed his medical internship and residency at Malmö's University Hospital, which is now merged into Skåne University Hospital. In 1981 he received from Lund University his doctorate with dissertation The activation of prothrombin on the platelet surface under the supervision of Johan Stenflo. Dahlbäck was a postdoc at La Jolla's Scripps Research, where his supervisor was Hans J. Müller-Eberhard, and later was a visiting scholar at Oklahoma Medical Research Foundation (OMRF). In 1989 at Lund University, Dahlbäck was appointed a full professor of clinical chemistry, specializing in hematology and cardiac and cardiovascular systems. He is also the director of the blood coagulation unit at Malmö General Hospital.

His research was important in showing that APC resistance is caused by a harmful mutation in the F5 gene corresponding to the protein Factor V; the specific mutation was subsequently identified by several groups of researchers and is now called Factor V Leiden. In 2013, Dahlbäck and colleagues identified the F5 gene mutation that causes the phenotype called "east Texas bleeding disorder".

He has received several honors and awards, including in 1996 the Louis-Jeantet Prize for Medicine and in 2019 H. M. The King's Medal (H.M. Konungens Medalj) of the 12th size from the Royal Court of Sweden. He is a member of the Royal Swedish Academy of Sciences.

In 2000, Academic Press published Hematology: Landmark Papers of the Twentieth Century , which included the 1994 paper Resistance to activated protein C as a basis for venous thrombosis by Peter J. Svensson and Björn Dahlbäck.

Selected publications

References

1949 births
Living people
20th-century Swedish physicians
21st-century Swedish physicians
Hematologists
Lund University alumni
Academic staff of Lund University
Members of the Royal Swedish Academy of Sciences